Anōshazād (Middle Persian), known in the Shahnameh as Nōshzād, was a Sasanian prince who was the leader of a revolt in southwestern province of Khuzistan in the 540s. He was the oldest son of king Khosrow I (r. 531-579), while his mother was a Christian and the daughter of the judge (dadwar) of Ray.

Etymology 
Anūšzad is a Middle Persian name meaning "son of the immortal". Nōshzād is the New Persian form, whilst the Greek form of the name is Anasozados.

Biography 

According to several sources, Anushzad was sometime before his revolt imprisoned in Gundeshapur by his father. According to Dinavari and Ferdowsi, it was because he had converted to Christianity. However, this is unlikely since neither Procopius nor Ibn al-Athir calls him a Christian; according to Procopius, Anushzad was imprisoned for seducing some of his father's wives, while Ibn al-Athir states that he was imprisoned because he was suspected of being a crypto-Manichaean.

According to Dinavari, while Khosrow I was campaigning in Syria against the Byzantines, he fell ill at Emesa—according to Nöldeke, however, Khosrow never reached the city and instead returned to his capital, Ctesiphon. He further states that Anushzad had spread false rumours of Khosrow having a deadly sickness. Anushzad thereafter raised an army, which consisted of prisoners and Christians from Hormizd-Ardashir and Gundeshapur. However, according to Nöldeke, Fariburz most likely didn't manage to get support from a large number of Christians, which he tried to do so by stating that his mother was a Christian. Nevertheless, he managed to capture Ahvaz and seize its riches.

Burzin, who was Khosrow's vice-regent at Ctesiphon, shortly sent an army under Fariburz to besiege Gundeshapur, and informed Khosrow of the revolt. Khosrow thereafter ordered him bring Anushzad back alive if possible, and to kill all the nobles participating in his revolt, but not the ordinary people. The revolt of Anushzad was eventually suppressed, while he was captured and taken to Ctesiphon, where he was blinded.

References

Sources
 

6th-century Iranian people
Year of death unknown
Year of birth unknown
Sasanian princes
Rebellions against the Sasanian Empire
6th-century births
6th-century deaths
Khosrow I